Government College Ibadan (founded 28 February 1929) is a boys' secondary school located on the hills of Apata Ganga in Ibadan, Nigeria.

History
The founding fathers of Government College Ibadan were Selwyn MacGregor Grier, Director of Education, Southern Provinces, who conceived the idea of the school, and E. R. Swanston, Inspector of Education. The school was conceived and founded on 28 February 1929. The first principal was C. E. Squire. The second principal was H. T. C. Field. V. B. V. Powell was the third principal. 

Government College was modelled on the British public boarding schools of the era, and the first set of students numbered 29. During the Second World War, the school temporarily moved to several sites before finally resettling back at its original site.
The alumnus popularly called Old Boys, holds an annual reunion programme in order to connect former students.

Curriculum
All students were required to complete a number of core courses in the arts and sciences. The courses were designed so that all students, no matter what their strengths were, obtained the basic skills of critical thinking, effective writing, effective oral communication, library literacy, laboratory competency, creative thinking and problem solving. The school was also known for cricket and field hockey. The school also had an Officer Cadet Corps that offered instruction camps in precision field drills, adventure training and the cadets were introduced to the principles of meritocracy.

Laurels in academics
In the period before the dissolution of the country's Western Region, the school earned the fame of being the best secondary school in Nigeria. It had well-resourced classrooms and laboratories. As the school grew in numbers of students, in reputation and in fame, its students achieved consistently high scores for exam results at O-level and A-level. In the 1960s, more than 78 distinctions were obtained by Government College students in the examinations, an unprecedented achievement in Nigeria. In the decade of the 1970s the school upheld its records in both the academic and extracurricular fields. The school has produced more than 80% of the presidents of the Nigerian Society of Engineers since its inception, and one of the only four Africans to be awarded a Nobel Prize.

School houses
Carr House (Orange)
Field House (Green)
Grier House (Maroon)
Powell House (Purple)
Swanston House (Blue)

Notable alumni

Adegoke Adelabu (1915–1958), distinguished politician
Akinola Aguda (1923–2001), first Chief Justice of Botswana
T. M. Aluko (1918–2010), eminent scholar and author
Segun Awolowo (born 1963), Lawyer & Businessman
Wale Babalakin (born 1960), Lawyer & President GCIOBA
Cyprian Ekwensi (1921–2007), distinguished author
Erediauwa, (1923–2016), King of Benin, Nigeria
Abel Guobadia (1932–2011), Ambassador, former Chairman, Independent National Electoral Commission
Christopher Kolade (born 1932), Nigerian Ambassador to the United Kingdom
Ifedayo Oladapo (1932–2010), University Vice-Chancellor
Victor Omololu Olunloyo (born 1935), former Governor Oyo State
Femi Osofisan (born 1946), Professor of Theater Arts
Ayo Rosiji (1917–2000), industrialist, former Minister of Labour
Olaokun Soyinka (born 1958), Medical Doctor
Wole Soyinka (born 1934), first African literary Nobel Laureate

External links
 
FGC and F.G.G.C classmate, old student Network Alumni website
Apata Ganga - My GCI Years

Secondary schools in Oyo State
Boys' schools in Nigeria
Buildings and structures in Ibadan
Schools in Ibadan
History of Ibadan
Educational institutions established in 1929
1929 establishments in Nigeria